Karapetyan, Karapetian or Garabedian (in Western Armenian Կարապետեան) is an Armenian surname.  It can refer to:

Garabedian 
Charles Garabedian (1923–2016), U.S. artist
Edna Garabedian (born ?), U.S. opera singer and director
John Garabedian (born 1941), U.S. radio personality
Khachadour Paul Garabedian  (1836–1881), Ottoman-born Armenian-American Navy Sailor
Mitchell Garabedian (born 1951), American lawyer known for representing sexual abuse victims
Paul Garabedian (1927–2010), U.S. applied mathematician and numerical analyst
Varoujan Garabedian (also as Varadjian Garbidjian, born 1954), Syrian-Armenian militant

Garapedian
 Carla Garapedian (born c. 1970's), U.S. (expatriate in the U.K.) documentary filmmaker

Karapetian
Farrah Karapetian (born 1978), American photographer
Aleksandre Karapetian (born 1987), Armenian footballer

Karapetyan 
 Andranik Karapetyan (born 1995), Armenian weightlifter
 Aram Karapetyan (born 1964), Armenian politician
 Gevorg Karapetyan (footballer, born 1963), Lebanese-Armenian footballer
 Gevorg Karapetyan (born 1990), Armenian footballer
 Karapet Karapetyan (born 1982), Armenian kickboxer
 Saak Albertovich Karapetyan (died 2018), Russian politician
 Samvel Karapetyan (author) (born 1961), Armenian historian
 Samvel Karapetyan (businessman) (born 1965) Armenian-Russian businessman
 Sergo Karapetyan (1948–2021), Armenian politician and agricultural minister
 Shavarsh Karapetyan (born 1953), Soviet Armenian finswimmer

See also
Karapet / Garabed

Armenian-language surnames